HMS Witch (D89) was a Modified W-class destroyer of the British Royal Navy that saw service in World War II.

Construction and commissioning

Witch, the first Royal Navy ship of the name, was ordered in January 1918 as part of the 13th Order of the 1918–1919 Naval Programme, and was laid down on 13 June 1918 by John I. Thornycroft & Company at Woolston, Hampshire. The pace of her construction slowed greatly after the Armistice with Germany brought World War I to an end on 11 November 1918, and she was not launched until 11 November 1919. She then was towed to Devonport Dockyard at Devonport, Devon, where her fitting-out took place slowly, and she was not completed until March 1924.

Service history

Interwar
Upon completion, Witch was commissioned in March 1924.  She saw little service and soon was decommissioned and placed in reserve at Rosyth, Scotland.

In 1939, Witch was recommissioned for the Royal Review of the Reserve Fleet by King George VI.

World War II

1939-1940
Witch remained in commission after the United Kingdom entered World War II in September 1939, and on 3 September 1939 she was assigned to the 15th Destroyer Flotilla at Rosyth for the defence of convoys in the North Sea steaming along the east coast of Great Britain. In October 1939 she was transferred to the Western Approaches Command for convoy escort duty in the Western Approaches and North Atlantic Ocean.
gala
On 7 March 1940 she and the destroyer  relieved the escort of Convoy HG 21F in the Southwestern Approaches during the final leg of its voyage from Gibraltar to Liverpool, where it arrived on 10 March 1940. On 19 March 1940, Witch and the destroyers  and  relieved the destroyer  of escorting Convoy HG 22F on the final segment of its Gibraltar-to-Liverpool voyage, returning to base at Liverpool after detaching from the convoy on 21 March 1940.

Witch soon was released from operations related to the Norwegian campaign and rejoined the 15th Destroyer Flotilla at Rosyth, returning to convoy escort operations in the North Sea along the east coast of Great Britain and patrol duties in the North Sea.

1941
In August 1941, Witch was transferred to the 10th Destroyer Flotilla for convoy escort duties in the Western Approaches. On 9 August 1941, Witch joined the escort of Convoy WS 8C, a military convoy which steamed from the Clyde to Scapa Flow as part of the build-up for a planned occupation of the Azores which later was cancelled; she returned to the Clyde on 10 August 1941. From 15 to 17 August 1941 Witch, Whitehall, and the Royal Netherlands Navy light cruiser  escorted Convoy WS 10X from Liverpool to the Clyde.

After the convoy arrived at Gibraltar on 26 September, Witch steamed back to the United Kingdom.

Witch repeated this pattern as 1941 wore on. From 1 to 4 October 1941 she formed part of the local escort of Convoy WS 12 
From 13 to 15 December 1941, Witch, Badsworth, Vanquisher and the destroyers  and  provided the local escort for Convoy WS 14 in the Western Approaches, as usual returning to the Clyde upon completion of this duty.

1942-1945
Witch continued her convoy escort duties in the North Atlantic into 1942 and was "adopted" by the civil community of Northwich, Cheshire, in March 1942 as a result of a Warship Week National Savings campaign. In 1942, she underwent conversion into a short-range escort.  Upon completion of this conversion and post-conversion trials and work-ups, she returned to convoy escort duty in September 1942 as part of the escort of Convoy ON 127. She continued North Atlantic convoy work until December 1942, when she deployed as part of the 5th Escort Group to the Caribbean for convoy duty. In January 1943, she escorted the tanker convoy Convoy TM 1 from the West Indies to Gibraltar; the convoy came under attack by German submarines during its voyage.

In early February 1943, Witch was part of the escort of Convoy ON 168 from the United Kingdom to Halifax, Nova Scotia, Canada. The following day, Witch joined the escort of SC 118, remaining with the convoy until detaching to refuel, after which she returned to her duties with the 2nd Escort Group.

Later in February 1943, the Royal Navy selected Witch for transfer to Freetown, Sierra Leone, for service with local escort forces there. Accordingly, she and the destroyer leader , and the destroyers  and  escorted Convoy WS 28 from 16 to 27 March 1943 during its voyage from the United Kingdom to Freetown, detaching on the latter date when the convoy arrived there and remaining there in her new role. In April 1943, she and Wolverine rescued 53 survivors of the British merchant ship Empire Whimbrel, which the German submarine U-181 had sunk on 11 April 1943 420 nautical miles (778 km) southwest of Freetown at position . From 26 to 28 April 1943, she joined Malcolm and Wolverine in serving as local escort for Convoy WS 29 during the final leg of its voyage to Freetown. Witch, Malcolm, Wolverine, and the destroyers  and  departed Freetown on 6 May 1943 as local escort for Convoy WS 29, detaching on 8 May 1943 to return to Freetown, and on 3 June 1943 Witch, Rapid, Wolverine, and the destroyer  departed Freetown as the local escort for Convoy WS 30, remaining with it until 9 June 1943, when Quadrant, the destroyer , and the Royal Australian Navy destroyer  relieved them and they detached to return to Freetown. From 10 to 12 July 1943, Witch and the corvette  escorted Convoy WS 31 during a leg of its voyage from Freetown to the Cape of Good Hope, detaching to return to Freetown when relieved by Rapid.

Witch continued her duties at Freetown through December 1943, when she was selected for transfer to convoy escort duties in the North Sea. During the early months of 1944, she steamed back to the United Kingdom, and by May 1944 she had begun operations in the North Sea, which she continued – taking no part in operations related to the Allied invasion of Normandy during the summer of 1944 – until the surrender of Germany in early May 1945. After that, she served on local port duties and in support of reoccupation forces during the summer of 1945.

Decommissioning and disposal
Selected for reduction to reserve status during the summer of 1945, Witch was decommissioned and placed in reserve after the 15 August 1945 armistice with Japan. She was sold to BISCO on 12 July 1946 for scrapping by G. Brunton, and later was scrapped in Scotland at Granton on the River Forth.

Notes

Bibliography

Notes
 HMS WITCH (D 89) -  V & W-class Destroyer
 uboat.net HMS Witch (D 89)

 

V and W-class destroyers of the Royal Navy
Ships built in Southampton
1919 ships
World War II destroyers of the United Kingdom